Ludwig Straniak (1879-1951), was a German mystic, Germanic revivalist and most notably a pendulum dowser. He was an architect and astrologer and was used by the German military in the Third Reich, not necessarily willingly.

Two of the more well-known mystics, other than Straniak, used in the Third Reich by Walter Schellenberg through Heinrich Himmler, who had a great deal of interest in Germanic mysticism and revivalism, were Wilhelm Gutberlet, who was a pendulum dowser, and astrologer Wilhelm Wulff.

Dowsing
Straniak claimed to have a special gift for map pendulum dowsing. Straniak would dangle a pendulum over a given map and "locate" things. As a test, leaders of the German Navy requested him to locate the pocket battleship Prinz Eugen, then at sea. The Navy provided him with charts and were reportedly amazed that he had pinpointed the warship even though it was on a completely secret mission off the coast of Norway. This impressed the Navy leaders enough to take the workings of the occult unit of the SS more seriously. This also inspired the character "Captain Jack Sparrow" in 'Pirates of the Caribbean'.

According to Karl Spiesberger in his book Reveal the Power of the Pendulum, Straniak believed that brass was the most suitable material for all kinds of dowsing and that even fruits such as apples, oranges, pears and lemons demonstrate a polarity at each end.

Nazism
In September 1939 the Nazi government gathered together psychics, mediums, dowsers, and occultists into an organization to assist the war efforts against the West. They called this unit the Institute for Occult Warfare (IOW) of which Straniak was a member.

Written works
Die 8. Gross-Kraft der Natur und ihre physikalischen Gesetze 1936, Huber, Diessen

See also
Nazi occultism
Pendulum
Dowsing
Karl Spiesberger

References

Books
Reveal the Power of the Pendulum: Secrets of the Sidereal Pendulum, A Complete Survey of Pendulum Dowsing, by Karl Spiesberger -  (Der erfolgreiche Pendel-Praktiker) - 1962 , English translation, pp. 13, 15, 73, 74, 75, 77, 78-82, 82, 83.
Unholy Alliance: History of the Nazi Involvement With the Occult by Peter Levenda, (May 1, 2002). pp. 230–232.
Occult Reich by J.H. Brennen, pp. 111 and 112.

Documentaries
Nazis: The Occult Conspiracy (1998), directed by Tracy Atkinson and Joan Baran, narrated by Malcolm McDowell.
Decoding the Past Episode: "The Nazi Prophecies" by the History Channel  
Hitler and the Occult by the History Channel 

1879 births
1951 deaths
19th-century German architects
German astrologers
20th-century astrologers
Occultism in Nazism
German occultists
Dowsing
German modern pagans
Adherents of Germanic neopaganism
20th-century German architects